The Hangzhou Bay Ring Expressway, officially the Hangzhou Bay Region Ring Expressway and designated G92, is an expressway in China that connects the city of Shanghai to the cities of Hangzhou and Ningbo in the neighbouring province of Zhejiang. Part of its route traverses the Hangzhou Bay Bridge.

Route
Its name as a ring expressway partially incorrect because the expressway has a northern terminus in Shanghai. It can be considered an orbital expressway with an extra section of roadway not part of the orbital to its north and east. This extra section extends from an interchange with the orbital and two other expressways, the S11 Zhapu–Jiaxing–Suzhou Expressway and the G15 Shenyang–Haikou Expressway, in Jiaxing, Zhejiang, to an interchange with G1503 Shanghai Ring Expressway at Dagang Interchange, Songjiang District, Shanghai.

The orbital

The ring of the Hangzhou Bay Ring Expressway is entirely in Zhejiang Province. It begins at its southern end in Gaoqiao, Yinzhou District, Ningbo, at an interchange with the G15 Shenyang–Haikou Expressway and the G1504 Ningbo Ring Expressway. Clockwise, it follows the southern shore of Hangzhou Bay to Hangzhou, where it turns north and becomes concurrent with G60 Shanghai–Kunming Expressway and G2504 Hangzhou Ring Expressway. The G2504 Hangzhou Ring Expressway eventually splits off to the west at an interchange in Jianggan District, and the Hangzhou Bay Ring Expressway turns to the east as it splits with the G60 Shanghai–Kunming Expressway. The expressway continues eastward, following the north shore of Hangzhou Bay until it reaches an interchange with the S11 Zhapu–Jiaxing–Suzhou Expressway and the G15 Shenyang–Haikou Expressway in Jiaxing. At this interchange, the extra, non-orbital section of expressway to Shanghai branches off to the north while the orbital continues to the south and crosses the bay using the Hangzhou Bay Bridge. This section, including the Hangzhou Bay Bridge, is concurrent with the G15 Shenyang–Haikou Expressway. After the bridge, the expressway continues south past Cixi City to an interchange with G9211 Ningbo–Zhoushan Expressway and G1504 Ningbo Ring Expressway. It continues south in a concurrency with G15 Shenyang-Haikou Expressway and G1504 Ningbo Ring Expressway for a short section in Yinzhou District before returning to its southern terminus.

The section to Shanghai
The section to Shanghai is not part of the ring or loop but is designated part of the expressway. It begins on the north side of the Hangzhou Bay Bridge, at an interchange with the S11 Zhapu–Jiaxing–Suzhou Expressway and the G15 Shenyang–Haikou Expressway, where it leaves the orbital section of the expressway. It travels north in a section concurrent with the S7 Hangzhou Bay Bridge North Connector Line to an interchange with G60 Shanghai–Kunming Expressway. At this interchange, the expressway turns eastward and is concurrent with G60 to Shanghai, where the expressway ends at an interchange with the G1503 Shanghai Ring Expressway at Dagang Interchange.

References

Chinese national-level expressways
Expressways in Shanghai
Expressways in Zhejiang